William R. Fairchild International Airport  is a public airport located within the city limits of Port Angeles in Clallam County, Washington, United States. The airport is owned by the Port of Port Angeles.

History
The airport was developed from 1934 through 1948 by the Works Progress Administration, the U.S. Army and the 
U.S. Navy. It was named Clallam County Municipal Landing Field when ownership was given to Clallam County in 1948. Three years later the county transferred the airport to the Port of Port Angeles. In 1953, William R. Fairchild started the Angeles Flying Service and became the first airport supervisor. The airport was renamed in his honor in September 1969, following his death in an aircraft accident earlier in the year.

Facilities and aircraft
It has two asphalt paved runways: 

 8/26 measuring   
 13/31 measuring   

The primary runway is operated with an instrument landing system and can handle aircraft up to an Airbus A319.

For the 12-month period ending December 31, 2018, the airport had 25,158 aircraft operations, an average of 69 per day: 79% general aviation, 20% air taxi, and <1% military. At that time there were 66 aircraft based at this airport: 91% single-engine, 4.5% multi-engine, 1.5% jet, and 3% helicopter.

Fairchild Airport is also home to Port Angeles' Civil Air Patrol squadron.

Airlines and destinations

Cargo

See also
 Washington World War II Army Airfields

References

External links
 Port of Port Angeles: William R. Fairchild International Airport
 Dash Air Shuttle
 WSDOT Pilot's Guide: Wm. R. Fairchild International (PDF 59 kb)
 WSDOT Economic Impacts: William R. Fairchild International (PDF 434 kb)
 Aerial photo from USGS The National Map
 

Airports in Washington (state)
Airfields of the United States Army Air Forces in Washington (state)
Transportation buildings and structures in Clallam County, Washington
Works Progress Administration in Washington (state)